Milan Bencz (Born 5 September 1987) is a Slovak volleyball player for Narbonne Volley and the Slovak national team.

He participated at the 2017 Men's European Volleyball Championship.

References

1987 births
Living people
Slovak men's volleyball players
People from Zlaté Moravce
Sportspeople from the Nitra Region
Slovak expatriate sportspeople in France
Expatriate volleyball players in France